In the context of information security, and especially network security, a spoofing attack is a situation in which a person or program successfully identifies as another by falsifying data, to gain an illegitimate advantage.

Internet

Spoofing and TCP/IP 

Many of the protocols in the TCP/IP suite do not provide mechanisms for authenticating the source or destination of a message, leaving them vulnerable to spoofing attacks when extra precautions are not taken by applications to verify the identity of the sending or receiving host. IP spoofing and ARP spoofing in particular may be used to leverage man-in-the-middle attacks against hosts on a computer network. Spoofing attacks which take advantage of TCP/IP suite protocols may be mitigated with the use of firewalls capable of deep packet inspection or by taking measures to verify the identity of the sender or recipient of a message.

Domain name spoofing

The term 'Domain name spoofing' (or simply though less accurately, 'Domain spoofing') is used generically to describe one or more of a class of phishing attacks that depend on falsifying or misrepresenting an internet domain name. These are designed to persuade unsuspecting users into visiting a web site other than that intended, or opening an email that is not in reality from the address shown (or apparently shown). Although website and email spoofing attacks are more widely known, any service that relies on domain name resolution may be compromised.

Referrer spoofing 

Some websites, especially pornographic paysites, allow access to their materials only from certain approved (login-) pages. This is enforced by checking the referrer header of the HTTP request. This referrer header, however, can be changed (known as "referrer spoofing" or "Ref-tar spoofing"), allowing users to gain unauthorized access to the materials.

Poisoning of file-sharing networks 

"Spoofing" can also refer to copyright holders placing distorted or unlistenable versions of works on file-sharing networks.

E-mail address spoofing 

The sender information shown in e-mails (the From: field) can be spoofed easily. This technique is commonly used by spammers to hide the origin of their e-mails and leads to problems such as misdirected bounces (i.e. e-mail spam backscatter).

E-mail address spoofing is done in quite the same way as writing a forged return address using snail mail.  As long as the letter fits the protocol, (i.e. stamp, postal code) the Simple Mail Transfer Protocol (SMTP) will send the message.  It can be done using a mail server with telnet.

Geolocation
Geolocation spoofing occurs when a user applies technologies to make their device appear to be located somewhere other than where it is actually located. The most common geolocation spoofing is through the use of a Virtual Private Network (VPN) or DNS Proxy in order for the user to appear to be located in a different country, state or territory other than where they are actually located. According to a study by GlobalWebIndex, 49% of global VPN users utilize VPNs primarily to access territorially restricted entertainment content. This type of geolocation spoofing is also referred to as geo-piracy, since the user is illicitly accessing copyrighted materials via geolocation spoofing technology. Another example of geolocation spoofing occurred when an online poker player in California used geolocation spoofing techniques to play online poker in New Jersey, in contravention of both California and New Jersey state law. Forensic geolocation evidence proved the geolocation spoofing and the player forfeited more than $90,000 in winnings.

Telephony

Caller ID spoofing 

Public telephone networks often provide caller ID information, which includes the caller's number and sometimes the caller's name, with each call. However, some technologies (especially in Voice over IP (VoIP) networks) allow callers to forge caller ID information and present false names and numbers. Gateways between networks that allow such spoofing and other public networks then forward that false information. Since spoofed calls can originate from other countries, the laws in the receiver's country may not apply to the caller. This limits laws' effectiveness against the use of spoofed caller ID information to further a scam.

Global navigation satellite system spoofing 

A global navigation satellite system (GNSS) spoofing attack attempts to deceive a GNSS receiver by broadcasting fake GNSS signals, structured to resemble a set of normal GNSS signals, or by rebroadcasting genuine signals captured elsewhere or at a different time.  These spoofed signals may be modified in such a way as to cause the receiver to estimate its position to be somewhere other than where it actually is, or to be located where it is but at a different time, as determined by the attacker.   One common form of a GNSS spoofing attack, commonly termed a carry-off attack, begins by broadcasting signals synchronized with the genuine signals observed by the target receiver. The power of the counterfeit signals is then gradually increased and drawn away from the genuine signals.  It has been suggested that the capture of a Lockheed RQ-170 drone aircraft in northeastern Iran in December, 2011 was the result of such an attack. GNSS spoofing attacks had been predicted and discussed in the GNSS community previously. A "proof-of-concept" attack was successfully performed in June, 2013, when the luxury yacht White Rose of Drachs was misdirected with spoofed GPS signals by a group of aerospace engineering students from the Cockrell School of Engineering at the University of Texas in Austin.  The students were aboard the yacht, allowing their spoofing equipment to gradually overpower the signal strengths of the actual GPS constellation satellites, altering the course of the yacht. In December of 2022, there was significant GPS interference in several Russian cities, largely attributed to the war with Ukraine.

Russian GPS spoofing
In June 2017, approximately twenty ships in the Black Sea complained of (US) GPS anomalies, showing vessels to be transpositioned miles from their actual location, in what Professor Todd Humphreys believed was most likely a spoofing attack. GPS anomalies around Putin's Palace and the Moscow Kremlin have led researchers to believe that Russian authorities use GPS spoofing wherever Vladimir Putin is located, affecting maritime traffic.
There were additional incidents involving Russian GPS spoofing including Norway spoofing during NATO exercise that lead to ship collision (unconfirmed by authorities)   and spoofing from Syria by the Russian military that affected Israeli main airport in Tel Aviv.

GPS Spoofing with SDR
Since the advent of Software Defined Radio, GPS simulator applications have been made available to the general public. This has made GPS spoofing much more accessible, meaning it can be performed at limited expense and with a modicum of technical knowledge. Whether this technology applies to other GNS systems remains to be demonstrated.

Preventing GNSS spoofing
The Department of Homeland Security, in collaboration with the National Cybersecurity and Communications Integration Center (NCCIC) and the National Coordinating Center for Communications (NCC), released a paper which lists methods to prevent this type of spoofing. Some of the most important and most recommended to use are:
Obscure antennas. Install antennas where they are not visible from publicly accessible locations or obscure their exact locations by introducing impediments to hide the antennas.
Add a sensor/blocker. Sensors can detect characteristics of interference, jamming, and spoofing signals, provide local indication of an attack or anomalous condition, communicate alerts to a remote monitoring site, and collect and report data to be analyzed for forensic purposes.
Extend data spoofing whitelists to sensors. Existing data spoofing whitelists have been and are being implemented in government reference software, and should also be implemented in sensors.
Use more GNSS signal types. Modernized civil GPS signals are more robust than the L1 signal and should be leveraged for increased resistance to interference, jamming, and spoofing.
Reduce latency in recognition and reporting of interference, jamming, and spoofing. If a receiver is misled by an attack before the attack is recognized and reported, then backup devices may be corrupted by the receiver before hand-over.
These installation and operation strategies and development opportunities can significantly enhance the ability of GPS receivers and associated equipment to defend against a range of interference, jamming, and spoofing attacks.
A system and receiver agnostic detection software offers applicability as cross-industry solution. Software implementation can be performed in different places within the system, depending on where the GNSS data is being used, for example as part of the device's firmware, operating system, or on the application level.

A method proposed by researchers from the Department of Electrical and Computer Engineering at the University of Maryland, College Park and the School of Optical and Electronic Information at Huazhong University of Science and Technology that aims to help mitigate the effects of GNSS spoofing attacks by using data from a vehicles controller area network (CAN) bus. The information would be compared to that of received GNSS data and compared in order to detect the occurrence of a spoofing attack and to reconstruct the driving path of the vehicle using that collected data. Properties such as the vehicles speed and steering angle would be amalgamated and regression modeled in order to achieve a minimum error in position of 6.25 meters. Similarly, a method outlined by researchers in a 2016 IEEE Intelligent Vehicles Symposium conference paper discuss the idea of using cooperative adaptive cruise control (CACC) and vehicle to vehicle (V2V) communications in order to achieve a similar goal. In this method, the communication abilities of both cars and radar measurements are used to compare against the supplied GNSS position of both cars to determine the distance between the two cars which is then compared to the radar measurements and checked to make sure they match. If the two lengths match within a threshold value, then no spoofing has occurred, but above this threshold, the user is alarmed so that they can take action.

Voice spoofing 
Information technology plays an increasingly large role in today’s world, and different authentication methods are used for restricting access to informational resources, including voice biometrics. Examples of using speaker recognition systems include internet banking systems, customer identification during a call to a call center, as well as passive identification of a possible criminal using a preset ”blacklist”.

Technologies related to the synthesis and modeling of speech are developing very quickly, allowing you to create voice recordings almost indistinguishable from real ones. Such services are called Text-to-Speech (TTS) or Style transfer services. The first one aimed at creating a new person. The second one aimed at identifies as another in voice identification systems.

A large number of scientists are busy developing algorithms that would be able to distinguish the synthesized voice of the machine from the real one. On the other hand, these algorithms need to be thoroughly tested to make sure that the system really works.

See also 
 Domain name spoofingclass of phishing attacks that depend on falsifying or misrepresenting an internet domain name
 

 
 , mixing letters from different alphabets to trick an unsuspecting user into trusting and clicking on a link, also known as "script spoofing".
 
  using spoofed network packets
 
  (most often by telephone or email).

Standard facilities that might be subverted
  (in order to use another, more appropriate one).

References 

Computer network security
Types of cyberattacks